Ja eventualno bih ako njega eliminišete is the second studio album by the Serbian punk rock band Atheist Rap, released by PGP-RTS in 1995. The album, previously available only on compact cassette, was re-released by Hi-Fi Centar, featuring bonus material. The album title is an acronym for "jebanje" ("fucking")

Track listing 
Music and lyrics by Atheist Rap plus The Clash, The Ruts, Beastie Boys, Soundgarden, NOFX, Dead Kennedys, KUD Idijoti, Ekatarina Velika, Neki Italijan, Mighty Mighty Bosstones, Kićo Slabinac, Zlatko M, Die Toten Hosen, Nomeansno, Dinosaur Jr, Pekinška Patka, Prljavo Kazalište, Dane, Slavko Matić, Kiki Glumac, Želimir Žilnik & Dika Manadžer. This album did not feature any samplers, nor any other digital audio sound sources.

1998 reissue track listing

Personnel

Atheist Rap 
 Zare (Zoran Zarić; bass)
 Acke (Aleksandar Milovanov; drums)
 Goja (Stevan Gojkov; guitar)
 Radule (Vladimir Radusinović; guitar, vocals)
 Dr. Pop (Aleksandar Popov; vocals)
 Pećinko (Vladimir Kozbašić; vocals)

Additional personnel 
 Atheist Rape: Marina, Zgro, Mali Ljuba, Brle, Baklaja, Stole, Adam, Majkić, Vijetnamac, Gaca, Sloba, Mirko, Rista, Bardun, Ivica Drobac, Darko Lažni Vladi, Mahariši Maheš Jogi, Jode, Dragaš, Erić.
 Atheist Rave: DJ Z
 Petar Ristić (executive producer)
 Darko Varga (mixed by [assistant])
 Vojislav Aralica (producer, mixed by)
 Jan Šaš (recorded by, mixed by)

External links 
 EX YU ROCK enciklopedija 1960-2006, Janjatović Petar; 
 Ja eventualno bih ako njega eliminišete at Discogs
 Ja eventualno bih ako njega eliminišete reissue at Discogs

Atheist Rap albums
1995 albums
PGP-RTS albums
Hi-Fi Centar albums